Pop music in Taiwan may refer to:

 Mandopop music in Taiwan
 Hokkien pop music in Taiwan